Beaufort Castle or Castle Dounie is a Baronial style mansion built in 1880 and incorporating older building work. There has been a castle on the site since the 12th century. Beaufort is the traditional seat of the Lords Lovat.

History
The earliest mention of the site, as Downie or Dounie Castle, occurs in the reign of Alexander I (1106–1124), when a siege took place. The original castle was built by the Byset family. The castle came into the hands of the Frasers in the late 13th century. English forces besieged the castle in 1303.

In the 1650s Dounie was attacked and burned by the forces of Oliver Cromwell during their invasion of Scotland.

The Fraser estates were inherited by Simon Fraser, 11th Lord Lovat (c.1667–1747), in 1699. Known as 'The Fox', Lovat became deeply involved in the Jacobite cause, which aimed to restore the deposed House of Stuart to the thrones of Scotland and England. Exiled to France, Lovat joined James Stuart, the Old Pretender, and converted to Catholicism. He attempted to recruit Scottish nobles to the cause, carrying messages to Scotland, but his dealings led to ten years imprisonment in France. Returning in 1714, he apparently renounced the Jacobite cause in return for possession of his estates. In the 1740s he commissioned William Adam to design a new house at Dounie. Adam's last work, the project only progressed to the supply of stonework to the site: construction never started since the Jacobite Rising of 1745 intervened. Lovat, changing allegiance again, supported the Jacobites, but was captured and executed after the Battle of Culloden. Dounie Castle was razed by the Duke of Cumberland, and the estate was declared forfeit.

From 1746 the estate was run by the Forfeited Estates Commissioners, appointed by Parliament to dispose of confiscated estates, and a small house was built on the site of the demolished castle to house the  factor (estate manager). In 1774 the estate was returned to Lovat's son, Simon Fraser of Lovat (1726–1782), who had raised and commanded the 78th Fraser Highlanders for the British Army. Proposals for a new house on the site were put forward in 1777 but not executed. In 1815 the estate was inherited by Thomas Fraser of Strichen (1802–1875), who was reinstated to the Lordship of Lovat in 1854. In 1839 he commissioned William Burn to extend the house, and also improved the grounds and estate. His son Simon Fraser, 13th Lord Lovat (1828–1887), built the present Beaufort Castle, to designs by James Maitland Wardrop, incorporating part of the 18th-century house.
 
The castle was sold in 1994 to Stagecoach director Ann Gloag by the 15th Lord Lovat, to meet inheritance taxes.

Description

The Baronial mansion incorporates a private Roman Catholic chapel.

The house is a category A listed building. The grounds are included in the Inventory of Gardens and Designed Landscapes, the national listing of significant gardens in Scotland.

See also
Castles in Great Britain and Ireland
List of castles in Scotland

References

External links

Castles in Highland (council area)
Category A listed buildings in Highland (council area)
Listed castles in Scotland
Clan Fraser
Clan Bissett
Inventory of Gardens and Designed Landscapes